This is the discography of Coolio, an American rapper.

Albums

Studio albums

Collaboration albums

Compilation albums

Singles

As lead artist

Guest appearances

Soundtrack appearances/compilation exclusives

Music videos

Notes 

A  "County Line" did not enter the Billboard Hot 100, but peaked at number 9 on the Bubbling Under Hot 100 Singles chart, which acts as a 25-song extension to the Hot 100.
B  "I Remember" did not enter the Billboard Hot 100, but peaked at number 7 on the Bubbling Under Hot 100 Singles chart, which acts as a 25-song extension to the Hot 100.
C  "Mama I'm in Love Wit' a Gangsta" did not enter the Billboard Hot 100, but peaked at number 19 on the Bubbling Under Hot 100 Singles chart, which acts as a 25-song extension to the Hot 100.

References

Hip hop discographies
Discographies of American artists